Below are the results of the 2017 World Series of Poker, held from May 31-July 22 at the Rio All Suite Hotel and Casino in Las Vegas, Nevada.

Key

Results

Source:

Event #1: $565 Casino Employees No Limit Hold'em

 2-Day Event: May 31-June 1
 Number of Entries: 651
 Total Prize Pool: $325,500
 Number of Payouts: 98
 Winning Hand:

Event #2: $10,000 Tag Team No Limit Hold'em Championship

 3-Day Event: May 31-June 2
 Number of Entries: 102
 Total Prize Pool: $958,800
 Number of Payouts: 16
 Winning Hand:

Event #3: $3,000 No Limit Hold'em Shootout

 3-Day Event: June 1-3
 Number of Entries: 369
 Total Prize Pool: $996,300
 Number of Payouts: 50
 Winning Hand:

Event #4: $1,500 Omaha Hi-Lo 8 or Better

 3-Day Event: June 1-3
 Number of Entries: 905
 Total Prize Pool: $1,221,750
 Number of Payouts: 136
 Winning Hand:

Event #5: $565 The Colossus III No Limit Hold'em

 6-Day Event: June 2-7
 Number of Entries: 18,054
 Total Prize Pool: $9,027,000
 Number of Payouts: 2,401
 Winning Hand:

Event #6: $111,111 High Roller for One Drop No Limit Hold'em

 4-Day Event: June 2-5
 Number of Entries: 130
 Total Prize Pool: $13,722,150
 Number of Payouts: 20
 Winning Hand:

Event #7: $2,500 Mixed Triple Draw Lowball

 3-Day Event: June 3-5
 Number of Entries: 225
 Total Prize Pool: $506,250
 Number of Payouts: 34
 Winning Hand:

Event #8: $333 WSOP.com Online No Limit Hold'em

 1-Day Event: June 3
 Number of Entries: 2,509
 Total Prize Pool: $752,700
 Number of Payouts: 333
 Winning Hand:

Event #9: $10,000 Omaha Hi-Lo 8 or Better Championship

 4-Day Event: June 4-7
 Number of Entries: 154
 Total Prize Pool: $1,447,600
 Number of Payouts: 24
 Winning Hand:

Event #10: $1,000 Tag Team No Limit Hold'em

 3-Day Event: June 5-7
 Number of Entries: 843
 Total Prize Pool: $758,700
 Number of Payouts: 127
 Winning Hand:

Event #11: $1,500 Dealers Choice 6-Handed

 3-Day Event: June 5-7
 Number of Entries: 364
 Total Prize Pool: $491,400
 Number of Payouts: 55
 Winning Hand:  (Omaha Hi-Lo)

Event #12: $1,500 No Limit Hold'em

 3-Day Event: June 6-8
 Number of Entries: 1,739
 Total Prize Pool: $2,347,650
 Number of Payouts: 261
 Winning Hand:

Event #13: $1,500 No Limit 2-7 Lowball Draw

 3-Day Event: June 6-8
 Number of Entries: 266
 Total Prize Pool: $359,100
 Number of Payouts: 40
 Winning Hand:

Event #14: $1,500 H.O.R.S.E.

 3-Day Event: June 7-9
 Number of Entries: 736
 Total Prize Pool: $993,600
 Number of Payouts: 111
 Winning Hand:  (Omaha Hi-Lo)

Event #15: $10,000 Heads Up No Limit Hold'em Championship

 3-Day Event: June 7-9
 Number of Entries: 129
 Total Prize Pool: $1,203,200
 Number of Payouts: 16
 Winning Hand:

Event #16: $1,500 No Limit Hold'em 6-Handed

 3-Day Event: June 8-10
 Number of Entries: 1,748
 Total Prize Pool: $2,359,800
 Number of Payouts: 263
 Winning Hand:

Event #17: $10,000 Dealers Choice 6-Handed Championship

 3-Day Event: June 8-10
 Number of Entries: 102
 Total Prize Pool: $930,600
 Number of Payouts: 16
 Winning Hand:  (No Limit Hold'em)

Event #18: $565 Pot Limit Omaha

 3-Day Event: June 9-11
 Number of Entries: 3,186
 Total Prize Pool: $1,593,000
 Number of Payouts: 467
 Winning Hand:

Event #19: $365 The Giant No Limit Hold'em

 Starting Flights: June 9, June 16, June 23, June 30, July 7
 Conclusion: July 8-9
 Number of Entries: 10,015
 Total Prize Pool: $3,004,500
 Number of Payouts: 1447
 Winning Hand:

Event #20: $1,500 No Limit Hold'em Millionaire Maker

 5-Day Event: June 10-14
 Number of Entries: 7,761
 Total Prize Pool: $10,477,350
 Number of Payouts: 1,165
 Winning Hand:

Event #21: $1,500 8-Game Mix 6-Handed

 3-Day Event: June 10-12
 Number of Entries: 472
 Total Prize Pool: $637,200
 Number of Payouts: 71
 Winning Hand:  (No Limit Hold'em)

Event #22: $10,000 No Limit 2-7 Lowball Draw Championship

 3-Day Event: June 11-13
 Number of Entries: 92
 Total Prize Pool: $864,800
 Number of Payouts: 14
 Winning Hand:

Event #23: $2,620 The Marathon No Limit Hold'em

 5-Day Event: June 12-16
 Number of Entries: 1,759
 Total Prize Pool: $4,147,722
 Number of Payouts: 264
 Winning Hand:

Event #24: $1,500 Limit Hold'em

 3-Day Event: June 12-14
 Number of Entries: 616
 Total Prize Pool: $831,600
 Number of Payouts: 93
 Winning Hand:

Event #25: $1,000 Pot Limit Omaha

 3-Day Event: June 13-15
 Number of Entries: 1,058
 Total Prize Pool: $952,200
 Number of Payouts: 159
 Winning Hand:

Event #26: $10,000 Razz Championship

 3-Day Event: June 13-15
 Number of Entries: 97
 Total Prize Pool: $911,800
 Number of Payouts: 15
 Winning Hand:

Event #27: $3,000 No Limit Hold'em 6-Handed

 3-Day Event: June 14-16
 Number of Entries: 959
 Total Prize Pool: $2,589,300
 Number of Payouts: 144
 Winning Hand:

Event #28: $1,500 Limit 2-7 Lowball Triple Draw

 3-Day Event: June 14-16
 Number of Entries: 326
 Total Prize Pool: $440,100
 Number of Payouts: 49
 Winning Hand:

Event #29: $2,500 No Limit Hold'em

 4-Day Event: June 15-18
 Number of Entries: 1,086
 Total Prize Pool: $2,443,500
 Number of Payouts: 163
 Winning Hand:

Event #30: $10,000 H.O.R.S.E. Championship

 3-Day Event: June 15-17
 Number of Entries: 150
 Total Prize Pool: $1,410,000
 Number of Payouts: 23
 Winning Hand:  (Omaha Hi-Lo)

Event #31: $1,000 Seniors No Limit Hold'em Championship

 3-Day Event: June 16-18
 Number of Entries: 5,389
 Total Prize Pool: $4,850,100
 Number of Payouts: 809
 Winning Hand:

Event #32: $1,500 Omaha Hi-Lo 8 or Better Mix

 3-Day Event: June 16-18
 Number of Entries: 688
 Total Prize Pool: $928,800
 Number of Payouts: 103
 Winning Hand:

Event #33: $1,500 No Limit Hold'em

 3-Day Event: June 17-19
 Number of Entries: 1,698
 Total Prize Pool: $2,292,300
 Number of Payouts: 255
 Winning Hand:

Event #34: $10,000 Limit 2-7 Lowball Triple Draw Championship

 3-Day Event: June 17-19
 Number of Entries: 80
 Total Prize Pool: $752,000
 Number of Payouts: 12
 Winning Hand:

Event #35: $1,000 Super Seniors No Limit Hold'em

 3-Day Event: June 18-20
 Number of Entries: 1,720
 Total Prize Pool: $1,548,000
 Number of Payouts: 258
 Winning Hand: 
 Note: James Moore won the event for the second consecutive year

Event #36: $5,000 No Limit Hold'em 6-Handed

 4-Day Event: June 18-21
 Number of Entries: 574
 Total Prize Pool: $2,669,100
 Number of Payouts: 87
 Winning Hand:

Event #37: $1,000 No Limit Hold'em

 3-Day Event: June 19-21
 Number of Entries: 2,020
 Total Prize Pool: $1,818,000
 Number of Payouts: 303
 Winning Hand:

Event #38: $10,000 Limit Hold'em Championship

 3-Day Event: June 19-21
 Number of Entries: 120
 Total Prize Pool: $1,128,000
 Number of Payouts: 18
 Winning Hand:

Event #39: $1,000 No Limit Hold'em Super Turbo Bounty

 1-Day Event: June 20
 Number of Entries: 1,868
 Total Prize Pool: $1,681,200
 Number of Payouts: 281
 Winning Hand:

Event #40: $1,500 Seven Card Stud Hi-Lo 8 or Better

 3-Day Event: June 20-22
 Number of Entries: 595
 Total Prize Pool: $803,250
 Number of Payouts: 90
 Winning Hand:

Event #41: $1,500 Pot Limit Omaha

 3-Day Event: June 21-23
 Number of Entries: 870
 Total Prize Pool: $1,174,500
 Number of Payouts: 131
 Winning Hand:

Event #42: $10,000 No Limit Hold'em 6-Handed Championship

 3-Day Event: June 21-23
 Number of Entries: 332
 Total Prize Pool: $3,120,800
 Number of Payouts: 50
 Winning Hand:

Event #43: $1,500 No Limit Hold'em Shootout

 3-Day Event: June 22-24
 Number of Entries: 1,025
 Total Prize Pool: $1,383,750
 Number of Payouts: 120
 Winning Hand:

Event #44: $3,000 H.O.R.S.E.

 3-Day Event: June 22-24
 Number of Entries: 399
 Total Prize Pool: $1,077,300
 Number of Payouts: 60
 Winning Hand:  (Razz)

Event #45: $5,000 No Limit Hold'em

 2-Day Event: June 23-24
 Number of Entries: 505
 Total Prize Pool: $2,348,250
 Number of Payouts: 76
 Winning Hand:

Event #46: $1,500 Pot Limit Omaha Hi-Lo 8 or Better

 3-Day Event: June 23-25
 Number of Entries: 830
 Total Prize Pool: $1,120,500
 Number of Payouts: 125
 Winning Hand:

Event #47: $1,500 No Limit Hold'em Monster Stack

 5-Day Event: June 24-28
 Number of Entries: 6,716
 Total Prize Pool: $9,066,600
 Number of Payouts: 1,008
 Winning Hand:

Event #48: $10,000 Seven Card Stud Hi-Lo 8 or Better Championship

 3-Day Event: June 24-26
 Number of Entries: 125
 Total Prize Pool: $1,175,000
 Number of Payouts: 19
 Winning Hand:

Event #49: $3,000 Pot Limit Omaha 6-Handed

 3-Day Event: June 25-27
 Number of Entries: 630
 Total Prize Pool: $1,701,000
 Number of Payouts: 95
 Winning Hand:

Event #50: $1,500 No Limit Hold'em Bounty

 4-Day Event: June 26-29
 Number of Entries: 1,927
 Total Prize Pool: $2,601,450
 Number of Payouts: 290
 Winning Hand:

Event #51: $10,000 Pot Limit Omaha Hi-Lo 8 or Better Championship

 3-Day Event: June 26-28
 Number of Entries: 207
 Total Prize Pool: $1,945,800
 Number of Payouts: 32
 Winning Hand:

Event #52: $1,500 No Limit Hold'em

 3-Day Event: June 27-29
 Number of Entries: 1,580
 Total Prize Pool: $2,133,000
 Number of Payouts: 237
 Winning Hand:

Event #53: $3,000 Limit Hold'em 6-Handed

 3-Day Event: June 27-29
 Number of Entries: 256
 Total Prize Pool: $691,200
 Number of Payouts: 39
 Winning Hand:

Event #54: $10,000 Pot Limit Omaha 8-Handed Championship

 4-Day Event: June 28-July 1
 Number of Entries: 428
 Total Prize Pool: $4,023,200
 Number of Payouts: 65
 Winning Hand:

Event #55: $1,500 Seven Card Stud

 3-Day Event: June 28-30
 Number of Entries: 298
 Total Prize Pool: $402,300
 Number of Payouts: 45
 Winning Hand:

Event #56: $5,000 No Limit Hold'em

 4-Day Event: June 29-July 2
 Number of Entries: 623
 Total Prize Pool: $2,896,950
 Number of Payouts: 94
 Winning Hand:

Event #57: $2,500 Omaha/Seven Card Stud Hi-Lo 8 or Better Mix

 3-Day Event: June 29-July 1
 Number of Entries: 405
 Total Prize Pool: $911,250
 Number of Payouts: 61
 Winning Hand:

Event #58: $1,500 No Limit Hold'em

 4-Day Event: June 30-July 3
 Number of Entries: 1,763
 Total Prize Pool: $2,380,050
 Number of Payouts: 265
 Winning Hand:

Event #59: $2,500 Big Bet Mix

 3-Day Event: June 30-July 2
 Number of Entries: 197
 Total Prize Pool: $443,250
 Number of Payouts: 30
 Winning Hand:  (Omaha Hi-Lo)

Event #60: $888 Crazy Eights No Limit Hold'em 8-Handed

 5-Day Event: July 1-5
 Number of Entries: 8,120
 Total Prize Pool: $6,489,504
 Number of Payouts: 1,120
 Winning Hand:

Event #61: $3,333 WSOP.com Online No Limit Hold'em High Roller

 1-Day Event: July 1
 Number of Entries: 424
 Total Prize Pool: $1,335,600
 Number of Payouts: 54
 Winning Hand:

Event #62: $50,000 Poker Players Championship

 5-Day Event: July 2-6
 Number of Entries: 100
 Total Prize Pool: $4,800,000
 Number of Payouts: 15
 Winning Hand:  (Omaha Hi-Lo)

Event #63: $1,000 No Limit Hold'em

 3-Day Event: July 3-5
 Number of Entries: 1,750
 Total Prize Pool: $1,575,000
 Number of Payouts: 263
 Winning Hand:

Event #64: $1,500 No Limit Hold'em/Pot Limit Omaha 8-Handed Mix

 3-Day Event: July 3-5
 Number of Entries: 1,058
 Total Prize Pool: $1,428,300
 Number of Payouts: 159
 Winning Hand:

Event #65: $1,000 No Limit Hold'em

 2-Day Event: July 4-5
 Number of Entries: 1,413
 Total Prize Pool: $1,271,700
 Number of Payouts: 212
 Winning Hand:

Event #66: $1,500 No Limit Hold'em

 4-Day Event: July 5-8
 Number of Entries: 1,956
 Total Prize Pool: $2,640,600
 Number of Payouts: 294
 Winning Hand:

Event #67: $25,000 Pot Limit Omaha 8-Handed High Roller

 3-Day Event: July 5-9
 Number of Entries: 205
 Total Prize Pool: $4,868,750
 Number of Payouts: 31
 Winning Hand:

Event #68: $3,000 No Limit Hold'em

 3-Day Event: July 6-8
 Number of Entries: 1,349
 Total Prize Pool: $3,642,300
 Number of Payouts: 203
 Winning Hand:

Event #69: $1,500 Razz

 3-Day Event: July 6-8
 Number of Entries: 419
 Total Prize Pool: $565,650
 Number of Payouts: 63
 Winning Hand: K-9-7-A-6-4-7

Event #70: $10,000/$1,000 Ladies No Limit Hold'em Championship

 3-Day Event: July 7-9
 Number of Entries: 718
 Total Prize Pool: $646,200
 Number of Payouts: 108
 Winning Hand:

Event #71: $1,000 WSOP.com Online No Limit Hold'em Championship

 1-Day Event: July 7
 Number of Entries: 1,312
 Total Prize Pool: $1,246,400
 Number of Payouts: 136
 Winning Hand:

Event #72: $10,000 Seven Card Stud Championship

 3-Day Event: July 7-9
 Number of Entries: 88
 Total Prize Pool: $827,200
 Number of Payouts: 14
 Winning Hand:

Event #73: $10,000 No Limit Hold'em Main Event

 10-Day Event: July 8-17
 Final Table: July 20-22
 Number of Entries: 7,221
 Total Prize Pool: $67,877,400
 Number of Payouts: 1,084
 Winning Hand:

Event #74: $1,000 + $111 The Little One for One Drop No Limit Hold'em

 6-Day Event: July 11-16
 Number of Entries: 4,391
 Total Prize Pool: $3,951,900
 Number of Payouts: 659
 Winning Hand:

References

External links
 WSOP schedule

World Series of Poker
World Series of Poker Results, 2017